Aliabad-e Shamshir Bar (also Romanized as ‘Alīābād-e Shamshīr Bar, Alīābād-e Shamshīr Bor, and ‘Alīābād-e Shamshīr Bor; also known as ‘Alīābād) is a village in Arzuiyeh Rural District, in the Central District of Arzuiyeh County, Kerman Province, Iran. At the 2006 census, its population was 330, in 74 families.

References 

Populated places in Arzuiyeh County